New Iberia station is a train station in New Iberia, Louisiana, United States. It is served by Amtrak, the national railroad passenger system.

History

The station was originally built in 1900 by the Texas and New Orleans Railroad. It also serves as the headquarters of the Louisiana and Delta Railroad. Coincidentally, the year the L&D was established, the station was listed on the National Register of Historic Places as the Southern Pacific Railroad Depot.

See also
National Register of Historic Places listings in Iberia Parish, Louisiana

References

External links

New Iberia Amtrak Station (USA Rail Guide -- Train Web)

New Iberia, Louisiana
Amtrak stations in Louisiana
Former Southern Pacific Railroad stations
Railway stations on the National Register of Historic Places in Louisiana
Buildings and structures in Iberia Parish, Louisiana
National Register of Historic Places in Iberia Parish, Louisiana
Railway stations in the United States opened in 1900
1900 establishments in Louisiana